Qavaqlu may refer to:
 Qavaqlu, East Azerbaijan
 Qavaqlu, West Azerbaijan